Algona Community School District is a rural public school district headquartered in Algona, Iowa.

The district, mostly in Kossuth County, has small sections in Hancock and Winnebago counties. It serves Algona, Burt, Titonka, and Whittemore.

History

On July 1, 2001, the Burt Community School District consolidated into the Algona district. On July 1, 2014, the Titonka Consolidated School District consolidated into the Algona district. The Algona district, which took control of the Titonka school building, was scheduled to sell it to the Titonka city government on January 12, 2015. On July 1, 2015, the Corwith–Wesley Community School District dissolved, with a portion of the district being reassigned to the Algona district. Most of Corwith–Wesley's secondary students were scheduled to go to Algona schools.

Starting in 2015, the Lu Verne Community School District began to send its secondary students to Algona schools as part of a new grade-sharing arrangement.

Schools
The district operates five schools, all in Algona:
 Algona High School
 Algona Middle School
 Bryant Elementary School
 Bertha Godfrey Elementary School
 Lucia Wallace Elementary School

See also
List of school districts in Iowa

References

External links
 Algona Community School District
 

School districts in Iowa
Education in Hancock County, Iowa
Education in Kossuth County, Iowa
Education in Winnebago County, Iowa
School districts established in 2014
2014 establishments in Iowa